Musical chairs is a children's game.

Musical Chairs may also refer to:
 Musical Chairs (1955 game show), a 1955 NBC game show hosted by Bill Leyden
 Musical Chairs (1975 game show), a 1975 CBS game show hosted by Adam Wade
 Musical Chairs (film), a 2011 film directed by Susan Seidelman
 Musical Chairs (Sammy Hagar album), 1977 
 Musical Chairs (Hootie & the Blowfish album), 1998
 Musical Chairs (musical), a 1980 Broadway show starring Grace Keagy
 "Musical Chairs" (Smash), an episode of the American television series Smash